Midway is an unincorporated community in Fayette County, West Virginia, United States. Midway is located near the northern border of Oak Hill.

References

Unincorporated communities in Fayette County, West Virginia
Unincorporated communities in West Virginia